Brookvale Oval (also known by the commercial sponsorship name 4 Pines Park) is a sporting ground located within Brookvale Park at Brookvale, New South Wales, Australia. The ground is owned by Northern Beaches Council and is primarily used by the Manly-Warringah Sea Eagles rugby league team. Brookvale Oval has an approximate capacity of 20,000 people. By the end of the 2022 season, Brookvale had played host to 712 first grade premiership games.

History 

In the late nineteenth century, the suburb of Brookvale was known as Greendale. The name Brookvale was later adopted as that was the name of the home built by the original grantee of the land, William Francis Parker. It was in this area that Dan Farrell built his stone house called "Inverness" which was later to become Manly Leagues Club.

The area known as Lot 47 A (Land Titles Office Vol. 1524 Fol. 122) was sold to Jane Malcolm in April 1907. Land title records suggest that between 1907 and 1911, Malcolm carried out a subdivision of Lot 47A into four blocks. From Alfred Road in the west to Pine Avenue in the east, these lots respectively measured 2 acres 2 roods 12 perches, 4 acres 1 rood 4 perches, 2 acres 0 roods 22 perches and 2 acres 0 roods & 2 perches. Lot 47A became known in the early 1900s as "Farrell’s Paddock", and it was the location of a public gathering in April 1910 to celebrate the extension of the tram line from Manly to the village of Brookvale.

In the following year, the State Government reached agreement with Warringah Shire Council to acquire land for a park near the Shire's Offices. The acquired land plus a smaller parcel of land bought from Miss Jane Malcolm (later known as Jane Try) from Brookvale, was officially opened in 1911 as Brookvale Park.  "Presumably inspired by local resident action at that time to secure a public park or village green for the suburb, Jane Malcolm presented to the Minister for Lands the largest of the four lots from Lot 47A (the lot measuring 4 acres 1 rood 4 perches) – under a caveat that it only ever be used for public recreation purposes. Although the ‘dedication’ refers strictly to the first lot of land donated by Jane Try, subsequent acquisitions by Council of the other lots owned by Mr & Mrs Try were described specifically for the purposes of public recreation or for enlarging the Park"

The Park was transformed into a showground within the first decade. In 1921, the Brookvale Show was established with the formation of the Warringah Agricultural, Horticultural, Amateur Sports and Athletic Association. Between 1919 and 1928 children from Brookvale School planted trees to commemorate Arbor Day and it was the setting for school sports days and Empire Day picnics.

During World War II, Brookvale Park was utilised by the Defence Force for training purposes.

Since 1945 onwards 
On 25 April 1951, a new attendance record at Brookvale was set at 9,447, with spectators overflowing onto the field for a match between Manly and South Sydney.

Over fifty annual shows were held at Brookvale Park before the show was moved to St Ives Showground. Trotting and ring events were features of early shows at Brookvale. The trotting track occupied a substantial area of the Park with lighting of the ring for night entertainment. Substantial improvements were later made to form a sporting oval by the addition of stands. Pavilions were constructed along Alfred Road to house show exhibits. Outside of the annual show period these pavilions were used for local church services and meeting rooms for the local community. They were also used by local bands as a place to practice.

'With the formation of the Manly-Warringah Rugby Club, known as the Sea Eagles, however, the situation changed. The horse events of the Show had to be transferred to an oval in Frenchs Forest because the horses’ hooves did too much damage to the turf of the rugby ground, and the Show itself ended its long association with the Park in 1992. The growth in popularity of the Rugby League competition led to the re-forming of the oval into a rectangular field in 1970–71, with major earthworks undertaken to form spectator ‘hills’ on the eastern and southern sides of it. Following this came the construction of simple but large concrete grandstands on the western and southern boundaries of the field, and finally the Ken Arthurson Pavilion that linked the two. The construction of these facilities necessitated the removal of the original grandstand and the various exhibition halls and show pavilion, and with that, the termination of their use by community organisations and their hiring out for social functions'.

While Manly Council favoured rugby union and would not permit league to be played at Manly Oval, Warringah Council was more sympathetic to the rugby league cause and encouraged the playing of rugby league matches at Brookvale Park. Thus when the Manly Sea Eagles were granted first grade status in 1947, the team's first match in the big league was a home game at Brookvale Oval against Western Suburbs on 12 April. Manly, captained by Max Whitehead and featuring others such as Johnny Bliss and Mackie Campbell (the grandfather of Manly's all-time leading try scorer Steve Menzies), played well against their more fancied opponents in that historic first match at Brookvale scoring three tries to one but narrowly losing the match 15–13 courtesy of a string of scrum penalties from referee Aub Oxford that allowed Wests fullback Bill Keato to kick six goals.

The ground was the setting for the NRL match between the Sea Eagles and Melbourne Storm which informally became known as the "Battle of Brookvale" after two players got sent off following an all-in brawl which occurred in the first half. Players and officials from both clubs copped the brunt of the National Rugby League for their roles in the match.

In September 2019, before the finals series, Manly's elimination home final against Cronulla was almost moved after traces of asbestos were reportedly found at the ground. The game went ahead after inspectors gave it the all clear.

Layout and use 
Brookvale has three grandstands stretching the western and southern sides of the ground. The Jane Try Stand, running along the western side is the biggest of the three. It is also one of the few grandstands of major Australian stadiums to be named after a woman. The Ken Arthurson stand in the south west corner, was constructed in 1995. It is named after the long serving Manly, NSWRL and ARL administrator who is known as the "Godfather of Manly". The Lyons-Menzies Stand, formerly known as the Fulton-Menzies Stand, is located at the southern end of the ground is elevated with standing room underneath. Originally just referred to as the Southern Stand, it was renamed after two Sea Eagles club legends, Bob "Bozo" Fulton and Steve "Beaver" Menzies. At the time of the stands renaming, Menzies and Fulton held the club try scoring records with 180 and 129 respectively, though Fulton's record was surpassed by fullback Brett Stewart in 2013, before being renamed in 2022. The Fulton name was transferred to the new Bob Fulton stand,  which opened in 2022 with a capacity of 3,000, and is situated at the front of the club's Centre of Excellence. A large hill runs along the eastern side. The ground's capacity is around the 20,000 mark.

Funding 
As the major stakeholder and leasee of the park, Manly-Warringah Football Club launched a "Save Brookie" campaign, aimed at government funding for improvement to the facilities including seating, accessibility, improved safety, corporate boxes and construction of another stand, likely behind the Eastern Hill. The Warringah Council (Local Government) initially pledged funding of $4 million dependent on further grants from State and Federal Governments.  The NSW State Government provided a further grant of $6 million in June 2008, and the club has restated its aim for a further $6 to $10 million from the Federal Government.

On 6 August 2013, the Federal Government announced a grant of $10 million regardless of the outcome of the 2013 Federal Election. This money is part of a planned $30 million upgrade of the oval which will include a new 4,350 seat grandstand complete with corporate facilities on the eastern hill, as well as upgrades to the Fulton-Menzies Stand. Family Hill (northern hill) is expected to remain as it is and the grounds capacity is expected to remain at around 23,000 when the planned re-development is finished.

In February 2017 a 3-year $1 million naming rights deal with Lottoland, renamed Brookvale Oval to "Lottoland". In August 2019 Lottoland group exercised its option to extend the sponsorship contract, worth $500,000 for another year to the end of the 2020 season. The final game to be played under the name "Lottoland" was in Round 9, 2021 of the NRL between the Manly Warringah Sea Eagles and New Zealand Warriors.
A 4-year deal was signed with 4 Pines Brewing Company to be named "4 Pines Park"

Construction of Centre of Excellence and grandstand
In February 2019 it was announced Brookvale Oval would receive a $36.1 million facelift including a 3000-seat grandstand and centre of excellence after securing a NSW government grant. The facility, which will be located at the northern end of the oval, began construction in October 2020 and was funded by the NSW Government (contributing $20 million) the Federal Government ($12.5 million), and Manly Sea Eagles ($600 thousand).

Attendance 
The single record attendance for any event at Brookvale was set during a regular season clash between the Manly-Warringah Sea Eagles and Parramatta Eels on 31 August 1986 which drew 27,655 fans. Given changes to the configuration of the ground undertaken in the 1990s it is unlikely that this record will ever be broken. The game is officially declared sold out when crowds creep around the 20–22 000 mark, although no official cut-off is continuously used.

In 2006, the ground saw its largest average attendance over an entire season, with an average of 15,484 patrons watching each of the club's 11 matches played there. Since the club started playing in 1947, over seven million spectators have visited the ground.

In 2013, the ground was marred by claims of racism and aggressive behaviour by fans, including recent taunting and racist slurs towards the wife and young daughter of Kiwis and Bulldogs forward Frank Pritchard.

The largest known attendance per decade at Brookvale Oval are as follows:
 1947–49  –  3,600* – Manly vs Balmain, Round 6, 1947
 1950–59  –  10,908* – Manly vs Western Suburbs, Round 6, 1958
 1960–69  –  13,644 – Manly vs Newtown, Round 1, 1964
 1970–79  –  25,876 – Manly vs Balmain, Round 11, 1976
 1980–89  –  27,655 – Manly vs Parramatta, Round 26, 1986
 1990–99  –  26,168 – Manly vs Canberra, Round 22, 1994
 2000–09  –  20,163 – Manly vs Canterbury, Round 25, 2006
 2010–19  –  20,510 – Manly vs South Sydney, Round 7, 2013
 2020–29 – 17,385 – Manly vs Wests, Round 9, 2022

* Attendance records for most games played at Brookvale Oval not known from 1947 to 1956.

Top 10 Attendances

Configuration for Sea Eagles games 
Seating at the ground is in one of three linked grandstands. The Jane Try stand houses those season-ticket holders of the Manly-Warringah Sea Eagles and is located on the western side of the ground. The Jane Try Stand opened in 1971 and was built at a cost of $250,000.

The second grandstand addition to Brookvale Oval was the Southern Stand built in 1979, located at the Southern end of the ground. The Southern Stand houses some corporate facilities. This stand was renamed at the end of the 2008 season. It became the Fulton-Menzies Stand after club legends Bob Fulton and Steve Menzies.

The most recent structural addition to the ground is the Ken Arthurson Stand. The stand was officially opened on Sunday 14 June 1995. It was built at a cost of $3.3 million and seats 1,250 people. The stand is named for the greatest administrator in the club's history and contains corporate boxes as well as reserved seating for fans. The Ken Arthurson Stand is located in the south-western corner of the ground between the Jane Try and Fulton-Menzies stands. In its early days it was often referred to as the link stand as it linked the two grandstands at the ground.

There is some limited general admission seating around the perimeter concourse of the ground with a depth of between 3 and 5 rows. Other general admission areas include the Eastern Hill, which spans the length of the eastern side of the ground, and the Scoreboard Hill (Family Hill) which is located is the behind underneath the scoreboard and temporary replay screen.

Ground improvements over the off-season following the 2011 premiership win, included extending of the Jane Try Stand to run the full length of the western touchline and the inclusion of corporate facilities. Delays in the completion of these works forced the Sea Eagles to play away for the first 5 games of the 2012 season.

Other uses

Rugby union 
In 2014, the North Harbour Rays announced Brookvale Oval as their home ground for the inaugural National Rugby Championship season.

The NSW Waratahs played their 2019 season opener Super Rugby game against New Zealand's Hurricanes on 16 February 2019 and attracted a sellout 17,111 crowd. The Waratahs played preseason matches at Brookvale Oval against the New Zealand's Highlanders in 2017 and the Melbourne Rebels in 2018.

Soccer 
In June 2014, A-League club Central Coast Mariners announced its intention to play at least one home game per season at Brookvale Oval. The Mariners scheduled the 2014–15 round 16 match against Adelaide United at Brookvale Oval, however it was relocated to the Mariners normal home ground Central Coast Stadium due to the poor condition of the grass at Brookvale Oval.

Playing surface 
Brookvale Oval turf cover is predominantly Kikuyu grass.

In March 2019 Northern Beaches Council CEO Ray Brownlee said "Council is committed to providing as safe a playing surface as possible at Brookvale Oval and has continued to invest around $160,000 each year in its ongoing maintenance". Council in its draft 2019–20 budget, allocated $1.2 million to upgrade the playing surface at Brookvale Oval.

This was originally to commence at the end of 2019 Sea Eagles season, but will now delay this resurfacing project until the end of the 2020 NRL playing season. This will allow sufficient time to consider other key factors such as optimal surface positioning and levels for the Centre of Excellence and Sea Eagles home game scheduling towards the back end of the 2020 season and front end of the 2021 season.

Gallery

External links

References

Rugby league stadiums in Australia
Rugby union stadiums in Australia
Sports venues in Sydney
Articles containing video clips
Manly Warringah Sea Eagles
Northern Eagles
1911 establishments in Australia
Sports venues completed in 1911